"Running with the Wolves" is the fourth single released by Aurora and the second single on Running with the Wolves and All My Demons Greeting Me as a Friend. It was written by Aurora, Michelle Leonard and Nicolas Rebscher and produced by Odd Martin Skålnes, Rebscher and Magnus Skylstad. On 20 April 2015, the song was officially released worldwide.

In 2020, as part of the Apple TV+ animated film Wolfwalkers, a newer version of the song was released, which is heard in the soundtrack and trailer. This version uses medieval Irish instruments as the backing music. The song was also used for the theme song for Wolfblood series 4–5, as well as Wolfblood Secrets in addition appearing on an episode of The Blacklist.

Composition
A Scandipop and electropop song, Aurora wrote it during the blood moon of 2014. The song is about freedom and joining nature again, getting away from phones and radio and all the distractions around us.

In an interview with The 405, she said: "I just imagined the moon turning all the people around the world into wild animals, running away from all the rules, all the materialism and technology. Just being a part of nature again, running free." She added:

Music video
The music video for "Running with the Wolves", directed by James Alexandrou, was premiered through Vevo on 10 June 2015. The singer also released an acoustic version of the song through Vevo on 7 July 2015. This video was directed by Kenny McCracken.

Charts

References

2015 singles
2015 songs
Aurora (singer) songs
Decca Records singles
Songs written by Aurora (singer)
Songs about wolves